The conspiracy theories relating to the assassination of Robert F. Kennedy, a United States senator from New York, relate to non-standard accounts of the assassination that took place shortly after midnight on June 5, 1968, in Los Angeles, California. Robert F. Kennedy was assassinated at the Ambassador Hotel, during celebrations following his successful campaign in California's primary elections while seeking the Democratic nomination for U.S. President; Kennedy died the following day at Good Samaritan Hospital.

The convicted murderer was a 24-year-old Christian Palestinian immigrant named Sirhan Sirhan, who remains incarcerated in Richard J. Donovan Correctional Facility for the crime. However, as with his brother's death, Robert Kennedy's assassination and the circumstances surrounding it have spawned various conspiracy theories, particularly regarding the existence of a second gunman. Such theories have also centered on a woman wearing a polka-dot dress claiming responsibility for the crime, and the involvement of the Central Intelligence Agency. Many of these theories were examined during an investigation ordered by the United States Senate and were judged to be erroneous by the Federal Bureau of Investigation, which investigated on the Senate's behalf.

Second gunman theory

Wounds
The location of Kennedy's wounds suggested that his assailant had stood behind him, but witnesses said that Sirhan stood facing west, about a yard away from Kennedy, as he moved through the pantry facing east. This has led to the suggestion that a second gunman actually fired the fatal shot, a possibility supported by Chief Medical Examiner-Coroner for the County of Los Angeles Thomas Noguchi, who stated that the fatal shot was behind Kennedy's right ear and had been fired at a distance of approximately one inch. Other witnesses said that as Sirhan approached, Kennedy was turning to his left, shaking hands, facing north and so exposing his right side. As recently as 2008, eyewitness John Pilger said there must have been a second gunman. On August 14, 1975, the Los Angeles County Board of Supervisors appointed Thomas F. Kranz as Special Counsel to the Los Angeles County District Attorney's Office to investigate the assassination. The conclusion of the experts was that there was little or no evidence to support this theory.

Bullet count
Sirhan's .22-caliber Iver Johnson Cadet revolver contained eight rounds, which were all fired. Since the assassination took place in a tight, confined pantry, all bullets became embedded in the walls, the ceiling, and the victims. Three bullets hit Kennedy; two stayed in his body and another tore through his arm. The five bullets that hit the other five victims stayed in their bodies, meaning one bullet (that passed through Kennedy's arm) would have been lodged in the room itself. Witnesses claimed that bullet holes were found in the door frames of the pantry, which were later destroyed. Robert Kennedy's son, Robert Kennedy Jr., later said that "There were too many bullets", and that "You can't fire 13 shots out of an eight-shot gun".

Acoustics
In 2007, analysis of an audio recording of the shooting made that night by freelance reporter Stanislaw Pruszynski appeared to indicate, according to forensic expert Philip van Praag, that at least 13 shots were fired. Van Praag also said the recording revealed at least two instances in which the time between shots was shorter than humanly possible and that different resonances indicated there was more than one gun. According to Van Praag, the firing of more than eight shots was independently corroborated by forensic audio specialists Wes Dooley and Paul Pegas of Audio Engineering Associates, forensic audio and ballistics expert Eddy B. Brixen, and audio specialist Phil Spencer Whitehead of the Georgia Institute of Technology. Some other acoustic experts, through their own analyses, have stated that no more than eight shots are recorded on the tape. Furthermore, acoustics expert, Edward John Primeau, analyzed the recording using a sophisticated computer program and only heard eight shots.

Forensic analysis
In 1975, a Los Angeles judge convened a panel of seven experts in forensics to examine ballistic evidence. They found that the three bullets that hit Kennedy were all fired from the same gun, but could not find a match between these bullets and Sirhan's revolver. They accused DeWayne Wolfer, the lead crime scene investigator who had testified at trial that a bullet taken from Kennedy's body was from Sirhan's revolver, of running a careless investigation. The forensic experts urged further investigation. An internal police document, which was later released, concluded that "Kennedy and Weisel bullets not fired from same gun" and "Kennedy bullet not fired from Sirhan's revolver."

On November 26, 2011, Sirhan's defense attorneys William F. Pepper and Laurie Dusek filed a 62-page brief in federal court asserting that a bullet used as evidence to convict Sirhan was switched with another bullet at the crime scene. The brief claims that this was done because the bullet taken from Kennedy's neck did not match Sirhan's gun. Pepper and Dusek claim that the new evidence is sufficient to find Sirhan not guilty under the law.

The security guard as second gunman theory
Thane Eugene Cesar has frequently been cited as the most likely candidate for a second gunman. Cesar had been employed by Ace Guard Service to protect Kennedy at the Ambassador Hotel. This was not his full-time job; during the day he worked as a maintenance plumber at the Lockheed Aircraft plant in Burbank, a job that required security clearance from the Department of Defense. He worked there from 1966 until losing his job in 1971. Author Dan Moldea wrote that in 1973 Cesar began working at Hughes, a job he held for seven years and which Cesar said required the second-highest clearance level at the plant. 

Cesar was a staunch opponent of the Kennedys and had publicly said he believed that if elected, Robert Kennedy would have, "sold the country down the road to the commies or minorities like his brother did." Cesar also held a number of extremist far-right views. 

When interviewed, Cesar stated that he did draw a gun at the scene of the shooting, but insisted the weapon was a Rohm .38, not a .22, the caliber of the bullets found in Kennedy. He also said he got knocked down after the first shot and was unable to fire his gun. The LAPD, which interviewed Cesar shortly after the shooting, did not regard him as a suspect and did not ask to see his gun.
 
Cesar stated that he did own a .22-caliber Harrington & Richardson pistol, and he showed it to LAPD sergeant P. E. O'Steen on June 24, 1968. But when the LAPD interviewed Cesar three years later, he claimed that he had sold the gun before the assassination to a man named Jim Yoder. William W. Turner tracked down Yoder in October 1972. Yoder still had the receipt for the H&R pistol, dated September 6, 1968, and bearing Cesar's signature, indicating that Cesar had sold the pistol three months after Kennedy's assassination, contradicting his 1971 claim that he had sold the weapon months before it. Moldea wrote that Cesar submitted years later to a polygraph examination by Edward Gelb, former president and executive director of the American Polygraph Association, in which Cesar denied any involvement in the assassination. He passed the polygraph test.

Manchurian candidate hypothesis

Another conspiracy theory relates to a Manchurian candidate hypothesis: that Sirhan was psychologically programmed by persons unknown to commit the murder, that he was not aware of his actions at the time and that his mind was "wiped" in the aftermath by the conspirators so that he would have no memory of the event or of the people who "programmed" him. Pepper claimed that this theory was supported by prison psychologist Edward Simson-Kallas. Sirhan claimed then, and has continued to claim, to have no memory of the assassination or its aftermath. Sirhan's lawyers in 2010 accused the CIA of hypnotizing Sirhan and making him "an involuntary participant".

The woman in a polka-dot dress
Some witnesses said they saw a woman in a polka-dot dress in various locations throughout the Ambassador Hotel before and after the assassination. One witness, Kennedy campaign worker Sandra Serrano, reported that around 11:30 p.m. she was sitting outside on a stairway that led to the Embassy Ballroom when a woman and two men, one of whom Serrano later said was Sirhan, walked past her up the stairs. Serrano said that around 30 minutes later, she heard noises that sounded like the backfire of an automobile, then saw the woman and one of the men running from the scene. She said that the woman exclaimed, "We shot him, we shot him!" According to Serrano, when she asked the woman to whom she referred, the woman said "Senator Kennedy." Serrano related her account to NBC's Sander Vanocur soon after the shooting.

Another witness, Evan Freed, also saw the woman in the polka-dot dress. Another reported seeing a woman in a polka-dot dress with Sirhan at various times during the evening, including in the kitchen area where the assassination took place. Serrano said that before her encounter with the polka-dot dress woman, she heard a series of shots that sounded like a car backfiring. LAPD criminologist DeWayne Wolfer conducted tests to determine whether Serrano could have heard the shots from her location and found that the shots would have caused just a ½-decibel change in sound at Serrano's location, so she could not have heard the shots. Additionally, Special Counsel Thomas F. Kranz commented in his report that Serrano admitted to fabricating the story after further interviews with investigating officers and that he was unable to find evidence to corroborate any aspect of the original account. Serrano maintained that she was worn down during relentless questioning by LAPD sergeant Hank Hernandez and coerced into a false retraction.

In 1974, retired LAPD officer Paul Sharaga told a newsman with KMPC in Los Angeles that as he was responding to the shooting in the hotel, an elderly couple reported to him that they saw a couple in their early 20s, one of whom was a woman in a polka-dot dress. The couple were smiling and shouting "We shot him... we killed Kennedy... we shot him... we killed him". Sharaga also said that he filed official reports of the incident, but that they disappeared and were never investigated.

CIA involvement
In November 2006, BBC Television's Newsnight aired a 12-minute screening of Shane O'Sullivan's documentary RFK Must Die. O'Sullivan said that while researching a screenplay based on the Manchurian candidate theory, he "uncovered new video and photographic evidence suggesting that three senior CIA operatives were behind the killing of the Senator". He claimed that three men seen in video and photographs at the Ambassador Hotel immediately before and after the assassination were positively identified as CIA operatives David Sánchez Morales, Gordon Campbell and George Joannides.

Several people who had known Morales, including family members, were adamant that he was not the man whom O'Sullivan claimed was Morales. After O'Sullivan published his book, assassination researchers Jefferson Morley and David Talbot discovered that Campbell had died of a heart attack in 1962. In response, O'Sullivan said that the man in the video might have used Campbell's name as an alias. He then took his identifications to the LAPD, whose files showed the men he identified as Campbell and Joannides to be Michael Roman and Frank Owens, two Bulova sales managers attending the company's convention at the Ambassador. O'Sullivan stood by his allegations, stating that the Bulova watch company was a "well-known CIA cover".

Views of those close to Kennedy
Kennedy's second son, Robert F. Kennedy Jr., believes his father was killed in a conspiracy. He has also said that his father believed that John F. Kennedy was assassinated in a conspiracy and that the Warren Commission was a "shoddy piece of craftsmanship".

References

Notes

Bibliography

Conspiracy theories
Kennedy, Robert F. assassination
Kennedy, Robert F. assassination